The International Olympic Committee (IOC) uses icons, flags and symbols to elevate the Olympic Games. These symbols include those commonly used during Olympic competition—such as the flame, fanfare and theme—as well as those used throughout the years, such as the Olympic flag.

The Olympic flag was created in 1913 under the guidance of Baron de Coubertin of France. It was first hoisted in Alexandria, Egypt, at the 1914 Pan-Egyptian Games. The five rings on the flag represent the inhabited continents of the world (the Americas were considered as one continent and Europe was treated as distinct from Asia). It was made to contain the colours (blue, black, red, yellow, and green) which are common to almost all flags around the world.

Motto and creed 

The traditional Olympic motto is the hendiatris Citius, Altius, Fortius which is Latin for "Faster, Higher, Stronger". It was proposed by Pierre de Coubertin upon the creation of the International Olympic Committee. Coubertin borrowed it from his friend Henri Didon, a Dominican priest who was an athletics enthusiast. Coubertin said "These three words represent a programme of moral beauty. The aesthetics of sport are intangible." The motto was introduced in 1924 at the Olympic Games in Paris. Coubertin's Olympic ideals are expressed in the Olympic creed:

 Coubertin got this text from a sermon by the Bishop of Central Pennsylvania, Ethelbert Talbot, during the 1908 London Games.

In 2021, the International Olympic Committee (IOC) approved the addition of the word "together", after an en dash, to the motto; it now reads "Citius, Altius, Fortius – Communiter", Latin for "Faster, Higher, Stronger – Together" (or, in French, "Plus vite, Plus haut, Plus fort – Ensemble"). According to some Italian Latinists, such as professor Mario De Nonno and professor Giorgio Piras, the word "communiter" or "communis" is incorrectly used and a linguistics error.

Rings 

The rings are five interlocking rings, coloured blue, yellow, black, green, and red on a white field, known as the "Olympic rings". The symbol was originally created in 1913 by Coubertin. He appears to have intended the rings to represent the five inhabited continents: Europe, America, Asia, Africa, and Oceania. According to Coubertin, the colours of the rings together with the white of the background included the colours composing every competing country's flag at the time. Upon its initial introduction, Coubertin stated the following in the August 1913 edition of Olympique:

In his article published in the Olympic Revue the official magazine of the International Olympic Committee in November 1992, the American historian Robert Barney explains that the idea of the interlaced rings came to Pierre de Coubertin when he was in charge of the USFSA, an association founded by the union of two French sports associations and until 1925, responsible for representing the International Olympic Committee in France: The emblem of the union was two interlaced rings (like the vesica piscis typical interlaced marriage rings) and originally the idea of Swiss psychiatrist Carl Jung: for him, the ring symbolized continuity and the human being.

The 1914 Congress was suspended due to the outbreak of World War I, but the symbol and flag were later adopted. They officially debuted at the 1920 Summer Olympics in Antwerp, Belgium.

The symbol's popularity and widespread use began during the lead-up to the 1936 Summer Olympics in Berlin. Carl Diem, president of the Organizing Committee of the 1936 Summer Olympics, wanted to hold a torchbearers' ceremony in the stadium at Delphi, site of the famous oracle, where the Pythian Games were also held. For this reason he ordered construction of a milestone with the Olympic rings carved in the sides, and that a torchbearer should carry the flame along with an escort of three others from there to Berlin. The ceremony was celebrated but the stone was never removed. Later, two American authors, Lynn and Gray Poole, when visiting Delphi in the late 1950s, saw the stone and reported in their History of the Ancient Games that the Olympic rings design came from ancient Greece. This has become known as "Carl Diem's Stone". This created a myth that the symbol had an ancient Greek origin.

The current view of the International Olympic Committee (IOC) is that the symbol "reinforces the idea" that the Olympic Movement is international and welcomes all countries of the world to join. As can be read in the Olympic Charter, the Olympic symbol represents the union of the "five continents" of the world and the meeting of athletes from throughout the world at the Olympic Games. However, no continent is represented by any specific ring. The 1949–50 edition of the IOC's "Green Booklet" stated that each colour corresponded to a particular continent: "blue for Europe, yellow for Asia, black for Africa, green for Australia, and red for America". This assertion was reversed in 1951 because there was no evidence that Coubertin had intended it: "at the very most he might perhaps have admitted it afterwards". Nevertheless, the pre-2014 logo of the Association of National Olympic Committees placed the logo of each of its five continental associations inside the ring of the corresponding colour.

An Olympic Rings emoji was added to WhatsApp on 24 July 2016 in version 2.16.7, it was later removed on 15 August 2016 in version 2.16.9.
It consisted of five  characters joined together with s, forming a joined character sequence.
It is assumed that this was part of a temporary agreement with the International Olympic Committee.
On Android WhatsApp's emoji keyboard included the symbol at the end of the sports section. However, on iOS WhatsApp doesn't have an emoji keyboard so users had to copy and paste the emoji sequence.

Different types of flags  

The Olympic flag was created by Pierre de Coubertin in 1913.

Specific flags used 

There are specific Olympic flags that are displayed by cities that will be hosting the next Olympic games. During each Olympic closing ceremony in what is traditionally known as the Antwerp Ceremony, the flag is passed from the mayor of one host city to the next host, where it will then be taken to the new host and displayed at city hall. These flags should not be confused with the larger Olympic flags designed and created specifically for each games, which are flown over the host stadium and then retired. Because there is no specific flag for this purpose, the flags flown over the stadiums generally have subtle differences, including minor color variations, and, more noticeably, the presence (or lack) of white outlines around each ring.

Antwerp flag 

During the Opening Ceremony of the 1920 Summer Olympics in Antwerp, Belgium, the Olympic flag with the five rings signifying the universality of the Olympic Games was raised for the first time at an Olympic Games.  At the end of the Games, the flag could not be found and a new Olympic flag had to be made for the handover ceremony to the officials of the 1924 Summer Olympics in Paris. Despite it being a replacement, the IOC officially still calls this the "Antwerp Flag" instead of the "Paris Flag". It was passed on to the next organizing city of the Summer Olympics until the 1952 Winter Olympics in Oslo, Norway, when a separate Olympic flag was created to be used only at the Winter Olympics (see below). The 1924 flag then continued to be used at the Summer Olympics until the Games of Seoul 1988 when it was retired.

In 1997, at a banquet hosted by the US Olympic Committee, a reporter was interviewing Hal Haig Prieste who had won a bronze medal in platform diving as a member of the 1920 US Olympic team. The reporter mentioned that the IOC had not been able to find out what had happened to the original Olympic flag. "I can help you with that," Prieste said, "It's in my suitcase." At the end of the Antwerp Olympics, spurred on by teammate Duke Kahanamoku, he climbed a flagpole and stole the Olympic flag. For 77 years the flag was stored away in the bottom of his suitcase. The flag was returned to the IOC by Prieste, by then 103 years old, in a special ceremony held at the 2000 Games in Sydney. The original Antwerp Flag has been on display at the Olympic Museum in Lausanne, Switzerland, with a plaque thanking him for donating it. The flag returned to Antwerp in 2004 and since 2013, the year that Antwerp bore the title of European Sports Capital, could the flag be admired in the entrance hall of Antwerp's city hall. In 2017, however, the flag was stored in the collection of the MAS due to the renovation of the town hall.

While the flag is recognized by the IOC, critics and historians note that the returned flag is not the one which was used in the 1920 opening ceremony, as the original flag was much larger than the one returned by Prieste.

Oslo flag 

The Oslo flag was presented to the IOC by the mayor of Oslo, Norway, during the 1952 Winter Olympics. Between 1952 and 2014, the flag was passed to the next organizing city for the Winter Olympics with its last appearance in Sochi 2014 Winter Olympics. Currently, the actual Oslo flag is kept preserved in a special box, and in its last number of appearances, a replica had been used instead.

Seoul flag 

As a successor to the Antwerp Flag, the Seoul flag was presented to the IOC at the 1988 Summer Olympics by the city of Seoul, South Korea, and was passed on to the next organizing cities of the Summer Olympics between 1988 til 2012, with its last appearance at London 2012 Summer Olympics.

Rio de Janeiro flag 

As a successor to the Seoul Flag, the Rio flag was presented to the IOC at the 2016 Summer Olympics by the city of Rio de Janeiro, Brazil, and has since then been passed to the next organizing city of the Summer Olympics.

Pyeongchang flag 

As a successor to the Oslo Flag, the Pyeongchang flag was presented to the IOC at the 2018 Winter Olympics by the city of Pyeongchang, South Korea, and has since then been passed to the next organizing city of the Winter Olympics.

Singapore flag 

For the inaugural Youth Olympic Games, an Olympic flag was created for the junior version of the Games. The flag is similar to the Olympic flag, but has the host city and year on it and was first presented to Singapore by IOC President Jacques Rogge. During the closing ceremony on 26 August 2010, Singapore officials presented it to the next organizing committee, Nanjing 2014.

Innsbruck flag 

For the inaugural winter Youth Olympic Games, an Olympic flag was presented to the IOC at the 2012 Winter Youth Olympics by the city of Innsbruck, Austria, and has since then been passed on to the next organizing city of the Winter Youth Olympics.

Flame and torch relay 

The modern tradition of moving the Olympic flame via a relay system from Greece to the Olympic venue began with the Berlin Games in 1936. Months before the Games are held, the Olympic flame is lit on a torch, with the rays of the Sun concentrated by a parabolic reflector, at the site of the Ancient Olympics in Olympia, Greece. The torch is then taken out of Greece, most often to be taken around the country or continent where the Games are held. The Olympic torch is carried by athletes, leaders, celebrities, and ordinary people alike, and at times in unusual conditions, such as being electronically transmitted via satellite for Montreal 1976, submerged underwater without being extinguished for Sydney 2000, or in space and at the North Pole for Sochi 2014. On the final day of the torch relay, the day of the Opening Ceremony, the Flame reaches the main stadium and is used to light a cauldron situated in a prominent part of the venue to signify the beginning of the Games.

Medals and diplomas 

The Olympic medals awarded to winners are another symbol associated with the Olympic games. The medals are made of gold-plated silver – for the gold medals – silver, or bronze, and are awarded to the top three finishers in a particular event. Each medal for an Olympiad has a common design, decided upon by the organizers for the particular games. From 1928 until 2000, the obverse side of the medals contained an image of Nike, the traditional goddess of victory, holding a palm in her left hand and a winner's crown in her right. This design was created by Giuseppe Cassioli. For each Olympic games, the reverse side as well as the labels for each Olympiad changed, reflecting the host of the games.

In 2004, the obverse side of the medals changed to make more explicit reference to the Greek character of the games. In this design, the goddess Nike flies into the Panathenic stadium, reflecting the renewal of the games. The design was by Greek jewelry designer Elena Votsi.

Olympic diplomas are given to competitors placing fourth, fifth, and sixth since 1949, and to competitors placing seventh and eighth since 1981.

Anthems 

The "Olympic Hymn", officially known as the "Olympic Anthem", is played when the Olympic flag is raised. It was composed by Spyridon Samaras with words from a poem of the Greek poet and writer Kostis Palamas. Both the poet and the composer were the choice of Demetrius Vikelas, a Greek Pro-European and the first President of the IOC. The anthem was performed for the first time for the ceremony of opening of the 1896 Athens Olympic Games but wasn't declared the official hymn by the IOC until 1958. In the following years, every hosting location commissioned the composition of a specific Olympic hymn for their own edition of the Games until the 1960 Winter Olympics in Squaw Valley.

Other notable Olympic anthems and fanfares include:

 "Olympische Hymne": A composition for orchestra and mixed chorus composed by Richard Strauss for the 1936 Berlin Summer Olympics.
 The "Olympic Fanfare" for the 1952 Helsinki Summer Olympics was originally composed by Aarre Merikanto for the 1940 Summer Olympics, which were cancelled. Merikanto's Fanfare won the fanfare contest organized in Finland in 1939, but the score was lost for over a decade; when rediscovered in 1951, it was decided to use it in 1952. It was recorded in 1953.
 "Bugler's Dream": Written in 1958 by Leo Arnaud as part of his Charge Suite, the theme is often thought of by Americans as the "Olympic Theme" due to its usage in television coverage by ABC and NBC, starting with the 1964 Olympics in Tokyo.
 The "Olympic March": The theme written by Yūji Koseki for the Tokyo 1964 Summer Olympics theme song.
 "Olympic Fanfare 1972": The winning submission for the Munich 1972 Summer Olympics theme song, used as the TV signature tune of the German Olympic Center (Deutsches Olympia-Zentrum, DOZ) and the prelude to the medal ceremonies, composed by Herbert Rehbein. It was performed by the Orchestra of the Bavarian Broadcasting Company (Orchester des Bayerischen Rundfunks) and members of the Air Force Band Neubiberg, conducted by Willy Mattes.
 "Olympic Fanfare and Theme": Composed by John Williams for the Los Angeles 1984 Summer Olympics, the theme was performed in the opening ceremonies by the United States Army Herald Trumpets conducted by then-Captain David Deitrick. The first recording, performed by an orchestra composed of Los Angeles-area musicians, was released in its entirety on the LP and cassette album The Official Music of the XXIIIrd Olympiad Los Angeles 1984, with a concurrent Japan-only CD release (which went on to win a Grammy in 1985). A slightly different arrangement of the piece was released on the Philips album By Request: The Best of John Williams and the Boston Pops Orchestra. In 1996, an alternate version of "Olympic Fanfare and Theme" was released on the album Summon the Heroes for the Atlanta Olympic Games, replacing the first part of the piece with Arnaud's "Bugler's Dream". The theme was also used in the closing ceremony of the 2010 Olympic Games, as the country' flagbearers entered BC Place Stadium surrounding the Olympic flame and when the Olympic flag was brought into the stadium by Vancouver mayor Gregor Robertson.
 "The Olympic Spirit": The theme written by John Williams for the 1988 Olympics in Seoul and used in the corresponding NBC broadcasts.
 "Summon the Heroes": The theme written by John Williams for the 1996 Summer Olympics in Atlanta.
 "Theme from The Adventures of Brisco County, Jr.": The theme song to this television show, composed by Randy Edelman, was first used by NBC for teaser commercial and promo spots in 1996; it would be retired following the 2016 Summer Olympics.
 "Call of the Champions": The theme written by John Williams for the 2002 Salt Lake Winter Olympics.

Several other composers have contributed Olympic music, including Henry Mancini, Francis Lai, Marvin Hamlisch, Philip Glass, David Foster, Mikis Theodorakis, Ryuichi Sakamoto, Vangelis, Basil Poledouris, Michael Kamen, and Mark Watters.

Kotinos 

The kotinos, is an olive branch, originally of wild olive-tree, intertwined to form a circle or a horse-shoe, introduced by Heracles. In the ancient Olympic Games there were no gold, silver, or bronze medals. There was only one winner per event, crowned with an olive wreath made of wild olive leaves from a sacred tree near the temple of Zeus at Olympia. Aristophanes in Plutus makes a sensible remark as to why victorious athletes are crowned with a wreath made of wild olive instead of gold. The victorious athletes were honored, feted, and praised. Their deeds were heralded and chronicled so that future generations could appreciate their accomplishments.

Herodotus describes the following story which is relevant to the olive wreath. Xerxes was interrogating some Arcadians after the Battle of Thermopylae. He inquired why there were so few Greek men defending Thermopylae. The answer was "All other men are participating in the Olympic Games". And when asked "What is the prize for the winner?", "An olive-wreath" came the answer. Then Tigranes, one of his generals uttered a most noble saying: "Good heavens! Mardonius, what kind of men are these against whom you have brought us to fight? Men who do not compete for possessions, but for honour."

However, in later times, this was not their only reward; the athlete was rewarded with a generous sum of money by his country. The kotinos tradition was renewed specifically for the Athens 2004 Games, although in this case it was bestowed together with the gold medal. Apart from its use in the awards ceremonies, the kotinos was chosen as the 2004 Summer Olympics emblem.

Olympic salute 

The Olympic salute is a variant of the Roman salute, with the right arm and hand stretched and pointing upward, the palm outward and downward, with the fingers touching. However, unlike the Roman Salute, the arm is raised higher and at an angle to the right from the shoulder. The greeting is visible on the official posters of the games at Paris 1924 and Berlin 1936.

The Olympic salute has fallen out of use since World War II because of its resemblance to the Nazi salute. It was used by the French team in the opening ceremony of the 1948 Winter Olympics.

Mascots 

Since the 1968 Winter Olympics in Grenoble, France, the Olympic Games have had a mascot, usually an animal native to the area or occasionally human figures representing the cultural heritage. The first major mascot in the Olympic Games was Misha in the 1980 Summer Olympics in Moscow. Misha was used extensively during the opening and closing ceremonies, had a TV animated cartoon and appeared on several merchandise products. Nowadays, most of the merchandise aimed at young people focuses on the mascots, rather than the Olympic flag or organization logos.

Intellectual property 

The Olympic movement is very protective of its symbols; as many jurisdictions have given the movement exclusive trademark rights to any interlocking arrangement of five rings, and usage of the word "Olympic". The rings are not eligible for copyright protection, both because of their date of creation and because five circles arranged in a pattern do not reach the threshold of originality required to be copyrighted.

The movement has taken action against numerous groups alleged to have violated their trademarks, including the Gay Games; the Minneapolis-based band The Hopefuls, formerly The Olympic Hopefuls; the Redneck Olympics or Redneck Games; Awana Clubs International, a Christian youth ministry who used the term for its competitive games; and Wizards of the Coast, publisher at the time of the IOC's complaint of the card game Legend of the Five Rings.

In 1938, the Norwegian brewery Frydenlund patented a label for its root beer which featured the five Olympic rings. In 1952, when Norway was to host the Winter Olympics, the Olympic Committee was notified by Norway's Patent Office that it was Frydenlund who owned the rights to the rings in that country. Today, the successor company Ringnes AS owns the rights to use the patented five rings on its root beer. In addition, a few other companies have been successful in using the Olympic name, such as Olympic Paint, which has a paintbrush in the form of a torch as its logo, and the former Greek passenger carrier Olympic Airlines.

Certain other sporting organizations and events have been granted permission by the IOC to use the word "Olympics" in their name, such as the Special Olympics, an international sporting event held every four years for people with intellectual disabilities.

The IOC maintains exclusive ownership and control of the use of Olympic Symbols through an international treaty and the IOC's demand for the enactment of laws in hosting locations to grant special trade mark protection to Olympic Symbols.  In 1981, the Nairobi Treaty, a treaty administered by the World Intellectual Property Organization, was signed by fifty-two states. All fifty-two signatories to the Nairobi Treaty became obligated under the treaty to protect Olympic Symbols against use for commercial purposes without authorization of the IOC. Under the Nairobi Treaty, if the IOC authorizes use of an Olympic Symbol in a country that is a party to the treaty, then that country's National Olympic Committee is entitled to a portion of any revenue generated from the IOC's authorization of use. The Nairobi Treaty provides for a framework of international intellectual property protection of the licensure of all Olympic Symbols.

In recent years, organizing committees have also demanded the passing of laws to combat ambush marketing by non-official sponsors during the Games – such as the London Olympic Games and Paralympic Games Act 2006 – putting heavy restrictions on using any term or imagery that could constitute an unauthorized association with the games, including mere mentioning of the host city, the year, and others.

See also 

 Ave
 Ave Imperator, morituri te salutant
 Bellamy salute
 Bras d'honneur
 Heil og sæl
 Quenelle (gesture)
 Raised fist
 Roman salute
 Zogist salute
 Paralympic symbols
 Pierre de Coubertin medal
 Olympiadane

References

External links 

 PBS The Real Olympics, 2004.
 the Raising of the Olympic flag in London, 26 September 2008
 Olympic Files - Mascots (in Russian)
 Bear Cub Misha Lover's Association, 1980 Summer Olympics mascot Misha's fan page (in Japanese)